New Auburn is the name of several towns in the United States:

 New Auburn, Minnesota
 New Auburn, Wisconsin

See also
 "New Auburn", a song by Big Red Machine featuring Anaïs Mitchell from the album How Long Do You Think It's Gonna Last?